"Sure Shot" is a song by American hip hop group Beastie Boys, released as the third single from their fourth album Ill Communication on June 2, 1994, two days after the album's release. The track features a sample from jazz flautist Jeremy Steig's "Howlin' For Judy", which provides the main instrumental part of the song.

Release
The CD and cassette maxi single (with a total of 7 tracks) features three remixes of the title track, by Large Professor, Mike Nardone and Dred Scott, and the Prunes, respectively.

It also features 3 new songs, "Mullet Head" (a punk-rock-style song whose title references the much-ridiculed mullet hair-style), "Son of Neckbone" (an instrumental track) and "The Vibes", a more traditional rap song akin to "Sure Shot". "Mullet Head" was also featured on the 1994 EP Pretzel Nugget.

Uses in popular culture
In the 2010 film Shrek Forever After, the Pied Piper, played by jazz flautist Jeremy Steig whose song "Howlin' For Judy" provides the track’s primary sample, briefly plays the song with his flute. Steig’s father William wrote the children’s book Shrek!, which the film series was based on.

The song also appears in the 2011 film 30 Minutes or Less and in the 2016 video game Forza Horizon 3.

It is also used as the opening theme of Season 2 of the TV series Patriot.

Music video
Directed by Spike Jonze, the music video for the single features the group, along with DJ Hurricane, singing, skating, and wearing suits while attending a party.

Track listing
 "Sure Shot" (LP Version)
 "Sure Shot" (Large Professor Remix)
 "Mullet Head"
 "The Vibes"
 "Sure Shot" (Nardone Mix)
 "Son Of Neckbone"
 "Sure Shot" (European B-Boy Mix)

Charts

References

Beastie Boys songs
1994 singles
Music videos directed by Spike Jonze
Songs written by Mario Caldato Jr.
Song recordings produced by Mario Caldato Jr.
1994 songs
Capitol Records singles
Songs written by Mike D
Songs written by Ad-Rock
Songs written by Adam Yauch